"The Saddest Song I Ever Heard" is the title of a R&B single by For Real.  Written by Diane Warren. "The Saddest Song I Ever Heard" spent eight weeks on the US singles chart. The song would be covered two years later by Australian girl group Cherry. Their version, released with the shortened title "Saddest Song", peaked at #46 in Australia.

Sony BMG released the video to YouTube in 2007, since the video has received nearly 350,000 views as of October 2009.

Personnel

Information taken from Discogs.

Latanyia Baldwin, Necia Bray, Josina Elder, Wendi Williams : lead and background vocals
Diane Warren : writer
Daryl Simmons : producer, keyboards and programming
Vance Taylor : piano
Ronnie Garrett : bass
Thom "TK" Kidd : recording engineer
Jon Gass : mixing engineer
Mike Alvord, Kevin Lively, Alex Lowe : assistant engineers

Chart positions

References

1997 singles
1996 songs
Songs written by Diane Warren
Arista Records singles
For Real songs
Song recordings produced by Daryl Simmons